The Intercollegiate Center for Classical Studies in Rome (ICCS) is an overseas study center located in Rome, Italy for undergraduate students in fields related to Classical Studies.  It was first established in 1965 by ten American colleges and universities; by 2007 the number of member institutions had grown to 113. It is sometimes called the Centro, the Italian word for center.

Structure
Each member institution furnishes a "faculty representative" to the Centro;  from these, four are elected by the institutional representatives to sit on a governing board called the Managing Committee, with a fifth member provided by Duke University, which provides administrative services to the ICCS. The Managing Committee elects its chair for a five-year term; the current chair is Professor Jeremy Hartnett of Wabash College. Until 1992, administrative services were provided by Stanford University. The Managing Committee hires a Professor in Charge (PIC) for each year, and three subordinate faculty members, who are responsible for instruction and are usually drawn from American colleges and universities. The Centro offers competitive admission to North American undergraduate students to study the Ancient City, Greek or Latin literature, Italian language, or (Renaissance and Baroque) Art History. A group of normally 36 undergraduate students are competitively selected as Centristi each semester.
  
The Centro has received financial support from the Andrew W. Mellon Foundation, the Samuel H. Kress Foundation, the Corning Incorporated Foundation, the Danforth Foundation, the Old Dominion Foundation, the David and Lucille Packard Foundation, its consortium of colleges and universities, former students, and friends. One of its founders was the American Classicist Brooks Otis, in whose memory the center's library is named.

Faculty
Normally there are four faculty members at ICCS Rome: a senior 'Professor in Charge' (PIC), two junior professors (often an associate professor and an assistant professor), and a graduate student assistant, the 'Resident Instructor' (RI). The Professor in Charge is chosen by the Managing Committee and the remaining faculty are hired competitively at the annual meetings of the Archaeological Institute of America and the Society for Classical Studies in January. Faculty duties vary in accordance with the organizational plans of the PIC, but the course load is nominally two courses per semester except for the RI, who teaches a 1-1 load with additional resident supervisorial duties. The professors live in ICCS-rented apartments in the neighborhood, while the RI lives on the premises of the ICCS.

Professors-in-Charge

Coursework
The main component of the curriculum at the ICCS is the so-called "Ancient City" course.  Worth two credits and demanding an exceptional amount of time, this course teaches the history and archaeology of the city of Rome with a focus on its topography, ancient and modern.  Although they are supplemented by a weekly lecture, field trips provide the core of the class, with two excursions per week, one a full day, and one a half day.  While pedagogies vary with each PIC, students are generally expected to give one or more on-site presentations, which help further emphasize the physicality of the field.

In addition to the ancient city course students must take two additional courses (some choose to take a third). One class must be in either the Greek or the Latin language. Currently Centro provides three electives, Elementary Italian, Renaissance and Baroque Italian art history and a course in Conservation Management. Paul Tegmeyer, a faculty member of John Cabot University, teaches the art history course.  The class consists of a weekly lecture Wednesday afternoons and a field trip Friday mornings, normally to a museum or church. Instruction in Italian is provided by Dr. Barbara Castaldo.

Life at the Centro
All students live in a small four-story building that previously served as a convent, located at Via Alessandro Algardi 19, in the Monteverde Vecchio section of Rome, having moved here from Via Ulisse Seni 2. Breakfast, dinner, and most lunches are eaten together on all weekdays; the bedrooms are small; the long and frequent field trips for the Ancient City course mean that class time is heavily weighted.

Suzanne Deal Booth Scholar-in-Residence
In 2012 a program of resident scholars was announced, funded by Suzanne Deal Booth. Booth Residents spend one week at the Centro during each academic year.

External links
 ICCS Newsletter 
 Duke Study Abroad : ICCS - Rome
 The Brooks Otis Library

Sources
Mary Taliaferro Boatwright, Michael Maas, Corb Smith, et al. 2015. The Centro at Fifty: The History of the Intercollegiate Center for Classical Studies, 1965-2015. Centro Press.  .

References

Foreign academies in Rome
Higher education in Italy
Educational institutions established in 1965
Rome Q. XII Gianicolense
1965 establishments in Italy